Great Russia (romanized Velikaya Rossiya) is an unregistered far-right nationalist political party in Russia. The party has been led by former Rodina deputy Andrei Saveliyev since its founding.

History
The party was formed in May 2007 by former Rodina leader Dmitry Rogozin at its founding congress, which included delegates from the Rodina bloc, the Congress of Russian Communities, as well as Alexander Belov, the leader of the anti-immigrant Movement Against Illegal Immigration.

Rogozin stated that the party would contest seats in the 2007 State Duma elections. Rogozin estimated that the party would obtain twenty five percent of the vote in the election, and opinion polls suggested the party had a good chance of crossing the seven percent threshold for representation in the State Duma.

On 24 July 2007, Great Russia was denied registration by the Federal Registration Service. The secretary of the party's ruling council, Sergei Pykhtin, said the party would either appeal the decision or submit new paperwork in an attempt to be registered. In September 2007, the party was again denied registration.

References

External links
Rogozin creates "Great Russia" Gazeta.ru 12 April 2007 
Will Russia's new party be built on Berezovsky's money? Regnum 13 April 2007
New Party Set Up With Plans to Win Every Fourth Seat in the Duma Kommersant 7 May 2007

2007 establishments in Russia
Conservative parties in Russia
Eastern Orthodoxy and far-right politics
Far-right political parties in Russia
National conservative parties
Nationalist parties in Russia
Political parties established in 2007
Russian nationalist parties
Political organizations based in Russia